The 19th CARIFTA Games was held in Kingston, Jamaica on April 14–16, 1990.

Participation (unofficial)

For the 1990 CARIFTA Games only the medalists and a few other athletes can be found on the "World Junior Athletics History" website.  An unofficial count yields the number of about 122 athletes (78 junior (under-20) and 44 youth (under-17)) from about 14 countries: Bahamas (22), Barbados (9), British Virgin Islands (2), Cayman Islands (2), Dominica (1), French Guiana (2), Grenada (5), Guadeloupe (5), Guyana (2), Jamaica (53), Martinique (9), Saint Lucia (1), Suriname (1), Trinidad and Tobago (8).

Austin Sealy Award

The Austin Sealy Trophy for the most outstanding athlete of the games was awarded for the second time in the role to Kareem Streete-Thompson from the Cayman Islands.  As in 1989, he won the gold medal in the long jump event, this year however in the junior (U-20) category, again with a remarkable jump of 7.94m, also being still the championships record in this category.

Medal summary
Medal winners are published by category: Boys under 20 (Junior), Girls under 20 (Junior), Boys under 17 (Youth), and Girls under 17 (Youth).
Results can be found on the "World Junior Athletics History"
website.

Boys under 20 (Junior)

Girls under 20 (Junior)

Boys under 17 (Youth)

Girls under 17 (Youth)

Medal table (unofficial)

References

External links
World Junior Athletics History

CARIFTA Games
International athletics competitions hosted by Jamaica
CARIFTA
1990 in Jamaican sport
1990 in Caribbean sport